The Maritime Administration of Latvia (MAL) is a government agency of Latvia that oversees maritime affairs. Its head office is in Riga.

The agency was established in 1994. It is subordinate to the Ministry of Transport.

Previously the Marine Accidents Investigation Division of the MAL investigated marine accidents and incidents. Beginning on 1 June 2011 the Transport Accident and Incident Investigation Bureau began investigating maritime accidents and incidents.

References

External links

 Maritime Administration of Latvia
 Maritime Administration of Latvia 

Government of Latvia
1994 establishments in Latvia
Maritime safety organizations